The 2015 Spikers' Turf season was the inaugural season of the men's volleyball league Spikers' Turf, the counterpart of the women's Shakey's V-League. In 2014, the Shakey's V-League introduced a men's division during its 21st conference. The following year, Sports Vision, the organizers of the Shakey's V-League decided to spin-off the men's vision as a separate tournament, giving birth to the Spikers' Turf.

Open conference 

The Open Conference, which started on April 5, 2015 was the inaugural conference of the Spikers' Turf.

 Participating Teams

 Preliminary
 All times are in Philippines Standard Time (UTC+08:00)

|}

 Semifinals

|}

 Finals
 Battle for Bronze

|}

 Battle for Gold

|}

 Final standings

 Individual awards

Collegiate conference 

The Spikers’ Turf Collegiate Conference was the 2nd conference of the Spikers' Turf which started on July 13, 2015  and ended on September 27, 2015 at the Filoil Flying V Arena in San Juan.

 Participating Teams

 Preliminary
 Group A

|}
 Group B

|}

 Quarterfinals

|}

 Final round
 All series are best-of-3

 Final standings

 Individual awards

 Notable records
 Howard Mojica of the EAC Generals holds the record of highest number of scored points in a single game, 41 points (38 spikes, 1 block & 2 service aces) in a match against the Ateneo Blue Eagles during the quarter finals round of the 2015 collegiate conference - ref. Match 34 P2
 The Ateneo Blue Eagles made history in the league by being the first team to sweep a conference (13 wins & 0 loss).

Reinforced conference 

The Spikers’ Turf Reinforced Open Conference was the 3rd conference of the Spikers' Turf that started on October 10, 2015 at the Filoil Flying V Arena in San Juan.

 Participating Teams

 Preliminary

|}

 Final round

 Final standings

 Individual awards

Venue
 Filoil Flying V Centre, San Juan City

Broadcast partner
 PTV-4

See also 
 2015 SVL season

References

Spikers' Turf
2015 in Philippine sport
College men's volleyball in the Philippines